Childrens Hospital, a situation comedy television and web series created by Rob Corddry, which premiered its first season online on TheWB.com on December 8, 2008. On July 11, 2010, Adult Swim began airing the web episodes in groups of two. Season two began on Adult Swim on August 22, 2010. Season three began on June 2, 2011. Season four began on August 10, 2012. Season five began on July 26, 2013, season six on March 21, 2015 and the seventh and final season on January 22, 2016.

As of April 15, 2016, 10 webisodes and 86 television episodes of Childrens Hospital have aired.

Series overview

Episodes

Web series (2008)
All ten episodes of the web series debuted on December 8, 2008. Each episode was 4–5 minutes long. The credited cast consisted of Lake Bell, Rob Corddry, Erinn Hayes, Rob Huebel, Ken Marino, and Megan Mullally.

Season 1 (2010)
The ten web episodes were doubled-up and reformatted as 11 minute TV episodes, which began airing on July 11, 2010. Each TV episode features a parody commercial in between the two webisodes, as well as a message from Corddry at the end. The credited cast consisted of Lake Bell, Rob Corddry, Erinn Hayes, Rob Huebel, Ken Marino, and Megan Mullally.

Season 2 (2010)
The second season consists of twelve 11 minute episodes. It debuted on August 22, 2010. The credited cast consists of Lake Bell (episodes 1, 2, and 6 only; uncredited in episode 8 and credited with the guest cast in episode 12), Rob Corddry, Erinn Hayes, Rob Huebel, Ken Marino, and Megan Mullally and newcomers Malin Åkerman and Henry Winkler.

Season 3 (2011)

Season 4 (2012)

Season 5 (2013)

Season 6 (2015)
After leaving Japan, the doctors are ready to return to Brazil.

Season 7 (2016)

References

External links
 

Childrens Hospital